Carallia borneensis is a tree of tropical Asia in the family Rhizophoraceae. The specific epithet  is from the Latin, referring to the species being native to Borneo.

Description
Its fissured bark is pale to brownish.

Distribution and habitat
Carallia borneensis grows naturally in Borneo, the Philippines and New Guinea. Its habitat is lowland forest from sea-level to  altitude.

References

borneensis
Trees of Borneo
Trees of the Philippines
Trees of New Guinea
Plants described in 1896
Taxa named by Daniel Oliver